The Federation of Gas Workers' Unions of Japan (Zenkoku Gas) is a trade union representing workers in the gas supply industry in Japan.

The union was founded in 1947, and later affiliated to the Federation of Independent Unions.  By 1970, it had 19,403 members.  In 1989, it affiliated to the Japanese Trade Union Confederation.  By 2020, it had 23,248 members.

References

External links

Energy industry trade unions
Trade unions established in 1947
Trade unions in Japan